A grey hat (greyhat or gray hat) is a computer hacker or computer security expert who may sometimes violate laws or typical ethical standards, but usually does not have the malicious intent typical of a black hat hacker.

The term came into use in the late 1990s, derived from the concepts of "white hat" and "black hat" hackers. When a white hat hacker discovers a vulnerability, they will exploit it only with permission and not divulge its existence until it has been fixed, whereas the black hat will illegally exploit it and/or tell others how to do so. The grey hat will neither illegally exploit it, nor tell others how to do so.

A further difference among these types of hacker lies in their methods of discovering vulnerabilities. The white hat breaks into systems and networks at the request of their employer or with explicit permission for the purpose of determining how secure it is against hackers, whereas the black hat will break into any system or network in order to uncover sensitive information for personal gain. The grey hat generally has the skills and intent of the white hat but will break into any system or network without permission.

According to one definition of a grey-hat hacker, when they discover a vulnerability, instead of telling the vendor how the exploit works, they may offer to repair it for a small fee. When one gains illegal access to a system or network, they may suggest to the system administrator that one of their friends be hired to fix the problem; however, this practice has been declining due to the increasing willingness of businesses to prosecute. Another definition of grey hat maintains that grey hat hackers only arguably violate the law in an effort to research and improve security: legality being set according to the particular ramifications of any hacks they participate in.

In the search engine optimization (SEO) community, grey hat hackers are those who manipulate websites' search engine rankings using improper or unethical means but that are not considered search engine spam.

History
The phrase grey hat was first publicly used in the computer security context when DEF CON announced the first scheduled Black Hat Briefings in 1996, although it may have been used by smaller groups prior to this time.   Moreover, at this conference a presentation was given in which Mudge, a key member of the hacking group L0pht, discussed their intent as grey hat hackers to provide Microsoft with vulnerability discoveries in order to protect the vast number of users of its operating system. Finally, Mike Nash, Director of Microsoft's server group, stated that grey hat hackers are much like technical people in the independent software industry in that "they are valuable in giving us feedback to make our products better".

The phrase grey hat was used by the hacker group L0pht in a 1999 interview with The New York Times to describe their hacking activities.

The phrase was used to describe hackers who support the ethical reporting of vulnerabilities directly to the software vendor in contrast to the full disclosure practices that were prevalent in the white hat community that vulnerabilities not be disclosed outside of their group.

In 2002, however, the Anti-Sec community published use of the term to refer to people who work in the security industry by day, but engage in black hat activities by night. The irony was that for black hats, this interpretation was seen as a derogatory term; whereas amongst white hats it was a term that lent a sense of popular notoriety.

Following the rise and eventual decline of the full disclosure vs. anti-sec "golden era"—and the subsequent growth of an "ethical hacking" philosophy—the term grey hat began to take on all sorts of diverse meanings.  The prosecution in the U.S. of Dmitry Sklyarov for activities which were legal in his home country changed the attitudes of many security researchers.  As the Internet became used for more critical functions, and concerns about terrorism grew, the term "white hat" started referring to corporate security experts who did not support full disclosure.

In 2008, the EFF defined grey hats as ethical security researchers who inadvertently or arguably violate the law in an effort to research and improve security.  They advocate for computer offense laws that are clearer and more narrowly drawn.

Examples
In April 2000, hackers known as "{}" and "Hardbeat" gained unauthorized access to Apache.org. They chose to alert Apache crew of the problems rather than try to damage the Apache.org servers.

In June 2010, a group of computer experts known as Goatse Security exposed a flaw in AT&T security which allowed the e-mail addresses of iPad users to be revealed. The group revealed the security flaw to the media soon after notifying AT&T. Since then, the FBI opened an investigation into the incident and raided the house of weev, the new group's most prominent member.

In April 2011, a group of experts discovered that the Apple iPhone and 3G iPads were "logging where the user visits". Apple released a statement saying that the iPad and iPhone were only logging the towers that the phone could access. There have been numerous articles on the matter and it has been viewed as a minor security issue. This instance would be classified as "grey hat" because although the experts could have used this for malicious intent, the issue was nonetheless reported.

In August 2013, Khalil Shreateh, an unemployed computer security researcher, hacked the Facebook page of Mark Zuckerberg in order to force action to correct a bug he discovered which allowed him to post to any user's page without their consent. He had tried repeatedly to inform Facebook of this bug only to be told by Facebook that the issue was not a bug. After this incident, Facebook corrected this vulnerability which could have been a powerful weapon in the hands of professional spammers. Shreateh was not compensated by Facebook's White Hat program as he violated their policies, thus making this a grey hat incident.

See also
 Anonymous (group)
 Computer crime
 Cyber warfare
 Hacktivism
 IT risk
 Metasploit
 Mischief
 Penetration test

References

Further reading
 
 

Hacking (computer security)